Yu-Gi-Oh! It aired in Japan on TV Tokyo from October 6, 2004 to March 26, 2008, and was succeeded by Yu-Gi-Oh! 5D's. Yu-Gi-Oh! GX follows the exploits of Jaden Yuki (Judai Yuki in the Japanese versions) and his companions as he attends Duel Academia (Duel Academy in the 4Kids version). It was later dubbed in English by 4Kids Entertainment and a manga spinoff was created by Naoyuki Kageyama. The series was followed by Yu-Gi-Oh! 5D's in 2008.

Plot

Taking place ten years after the events of Yu-Gi-Oh!, Yu-Gi-Oh! GX follows a new generation of duelists including a young boy named Jaden Yuki (Judai Yuki) who attends Duel Academy, a school founded by Seto Kaiba, where aspiring duelists train in the field of Duel Monsters. The academy has an internal ranking system based on the "Egyptian God" cards from Battle City. Obelisk Blue is the highest dorm and is filled with only the best duelists or those who come from elite families. Ra Yellow is the second-highest dorm and is made up of duelists who score and perform well in school and have the potential to be the best. Slifer Red is the lowest dorm and consists of those who do not perform well and need much help to improve. Students are able to graduate to the next dorm if they show improvement. In the universe of Yu-Gi-Oh!, this series focuses on the type of summoning called "Fusion Summon", which the protagonist and many characters perform.

For the first year at Duel Academy, Jaden befriends many students such as Syrus Truesdale (Sho Marufuji), Jaden's roommate with low self esteem and Zane's brother, Alexis Rhodes (Asuka Tenjoin), one of the top female duelists and Jaden's love interest, Bastion Misawa (Daichi Misawa), an excellent duelist with an extremely high intellect, Chazz Princeton (Jun Manjoime), one of Jaden's rivals with an elitist personality, and Zane Truesdale (Ryo Marufuji), Jaden's other rival and the best duelist in the school. Together the main cast faced major threats including the Shadow Riders (Seven Stars), who intended to revive the Sacred Beasts, powerful cards that could destroy the world. This group was led by Kagemaru and consisted of Nightshroud (Alexis's brother Atticus possessed by darkness), Camula (a vampire), Tania (an Amazon Warrior), Don Zaloog (a duel spirit), Abydos (an Egyptian pharaoh), Titan (an illusionist) and Amnael (an alchemist who posed as the Slifer Red's dorm advisor, Professor Banner). After the Shadow Riders are defeated, Zane chooses Jaden to duel him in his graduation match which ends in the only draw of the series, after which he passes on the title of top duelist in the school to Jaden.

In the second year, Jaden meets Aster Phoenix (Edo Phoenix), a duelling prodigy, and Tyranno Hassleberry, a duelist with a love for the army and dinosaurs. The main cast then face off against the Society of Light, a cult-like organization who infiltrated Duel Academy. They are led by Sartorius, Aster's manager, and intend to brainwash humanity with the powerful "Light of Destruction", a light in space that has the ability to corrupt. It is revealed that when one duels someone from the Society of Light, they also become brainwashed and become one of their members. This caused many of Jaden's friends, namely Chazz, Alexis, and Bastion, to become Jaden's enemy. Jaden learns that he has the ability to talk to Duel Spirits (similar to Yugi Mutou) due to his ability to use the "Gentle Darkness", a force created to balance out the Light of Destruction. He use this to beat Sartorious and free everyone from the influence.

In the third year, Duel Academy is transported to another dimension, a desert plane with three suns and resident Duel Monster spirits, ruled by Yubel, a duel monster who was corrupted by the light. Upon returning home, Jaden and a select group of his partners dive back into the alternate dimension to recover their missing companions. After seeing his friends sacrificed, Jaden falls into despair and becomes possessed by the Supreme King, a ruthless and merciless ruler and the original wielder of the Gentle Darkness, which granted him immense power. During his time as the Supreme King, Jaden commits many crimes such as burning down villages, enslaving civilians, and sometimes even executing others. He is later freed of the influence by his friends in a duel, but is left with an immense amount of guilt. It is later revealed that Jaden in fact is the reincarnation of the Supreme King, and the Supreme King's power is a part of him. Jaden faces off against Yubel and learns that Yubel actually was the guardian of the Supreme King who was sworn to always be with him and protect him. Yubel was driven insane by the Light of Destruction and wishes to fuse all dimensions together so she could always be with Jaden. Seeing that Yubel was just trying to fulfil her promise, Jaden decides to use "Super Polymerization" and fuse himself with Yubel to help fulfil that promise and cleanse her of her corruption.

In the fourth year, Jaden returns to Duel Academy for his final year. Since he fused himself with Yubel, he has gained her powers as well as her bi-chromatic eyes when he uses her powers. However,  since he came back from the alternate dimension, he has become more solitary and distant from his friends as he does not wish to cause trouble for anyone anymore. He also lost his happy-go-lucky personality and his love for duelling; having endured such horrors over the past three years at Duel Academy, his belief that one duels for fun and enjoy yourself has been sapped out of him, and he only duels for survival. Despite this, Jaden is confronted by Nightshroud, the same spirit that possessed Atticus back in his first year, who tells Jaden that he will engulf this world in darkness by feeding off the negative emotions of humanity. Jaden originally fights off his minions until he comes face to face with Nightshroud himself. He duels him and successfully defeats him, freeing everyone of their darkness. Over the year, Jaden had slowly grown closer to his friends once again and began to reclaim his love for duelling, but on his final night, Jaden is going to leave the academy without saying goodbye. He is then stopped by an adult Yugi Mutou who transports him back in time for his 'graduation match' against Yugi Mutou from the past. During this duel, Jaden reflects on his time at Duel Academy and the great friendships he has made along the way. He expresses his gratitude towards Yugi and officially reclaims his old personality and, spurred on by the opportunity to battle one of Yugi's Egyptian God cards (in this case, Slifer the Sky Dragon), his love of duelling once again.

Production
Yu-Gi-Oh! GX is produced by Nihon Ad Systems and TV Tokyo, and the animation is handled by Studio Gallop. The series was directed by Hatsuki Tsuji and scripts were prepared by an alternating lineup of writers–Shin Yoshida, Atsushi Maekawa, Akemi Omode, Yasuyuki Suzuki–with music arrangements by Yutaka Minobe. Takuya Hiramitsu is in charge of sound direction, supervised by Yūji Mitsuya. Character and monster designs are overseen by Kenichi Hara, while Duel layout is overseen by Masahiro Hikokubo. The "GX" in the series' title is short for the term "Generation neXt". "GENEX" was conceived as the series' original title, as can be evidenced in early promotional artwork. It also refers to the GX tournament that takes place between episodes 84 and 104.

The program is divided into episodes classified as "turns". The title sequence and closing credits are accompanied by lyrics varying over the course of the series, with the former immediately followed by an individual episode's number and title. Eyecatches begin and end commercial breaks halfway through each episode; in the first season, there were two eyecatches per episode, usually showcasing the opponents and their key monsters for a given episode while in later seasons, a single eyecatch appears with only the duelists. After the credits, a preview of the next episode, narrated most frequently by KENN and Masami Suzuki, is made, followed by a brief "Today's Strongest Card" segment.

Media

Anime

The 180-episode series aired in Japan on TV Tokyo between October 6, 2004 and March 26, 2008, and was followed by Yu-Gi-Oh! 5D's.

It was subsequently licensed by 4Kids Entertainment and adapted into English, picked up by Cartoon Network and 4KidsTV in North America. Like previous 4Kids adaptations, several changes were made from the original Japanese version, including the names and personalities of characters, the soundtrack, the sound effects, the appearance of visuals such as Life Point counters, and the appearance of cards. The story and some of the visuals are also edited to remove references to death, blood, violence and religion in order to make the series suitable for a younger audience. Also any written language text, either Japanese or English is erased or replaced with unreadable content. These edits are also used in various localizations of the show in countries outside of Asia where 4Kids had distribution rights. For unknown reasons the US broadcast of the Third season was first delayed from broadcast for two months after the conclusion of the second season, then its airing period Extended to run over the course of 16 months until the end of August 2008.  The last episode of the third season and the fourth season in its entirety were not dubbed for unknown reasons (possibly as consequence of the third season's delays), leaving them for many years as Japanese-exclusive; with Yu-Gi-Oh! 5D's beginning to be run in September 2008, three weeks after the US-Broadcast airing of GX season 3's last dubbed episode.

Dubbed episodes were uploaded onto 4Kids' YouTube page until March 29, 2011, when Nihon Ad Systems and TV Tokyo sued 4Kids and terminated the licensing agreement for the Yu-Gi-Oh! franchise. The series is currently licensed by 4K Media Inc. Hulu and Crunchyroll are currently streaming dubbed episodes, with the latter beginning to stream the subtitled Japanese version of the series in August 2015.

Music
Japanese
Opening themes
  by Jindou (Episodes 1-33)
 "99%" by BOWL (Episodes 34-104)
  by BOWL (Episodes 105-156)
 "Precious Time, Glory Days" by Psychic Lover (Episodes 157-180)
Ending themes
  by JAM Project (Episodes 1-33)
 "Wake up your Heart" by KENN (Episodes 34-104)
  by Bite the Lung (Episodes 105-156)
 "Endless Dream" by Hiroshi Kitadani (Episodes 157-180)

English
 "Get Your Game On" by Alex Walker, Jake Siegler and Matthew Ordek.

Manga

A manga spin-off of the series supervised by Kazuki Takahashi and written and illustrated by Naoyuki Kageyama began serialization in V Jump on December 17, 2005. The chapters have been collected and published in nine tankōbon volumes by Shueisha starting on November 2, 2006. The manga is licensed for English language release by Viz Media, which serialized the first 37 chapters in its Shonen Jump manga anthology. The remaining chapters were published straight to graphic novel, beginning with volume 5. The plot of the manga is completely different from the anime and is more of a continuation to the original Yu-Gi-Oh! series with Shadow Games and the Millennium Items playing a major role within the story. There are also new monsters and changes to some of the characters' personalities. Unlike the original Yu-Gi-Oh! manga, all the names used in the English version of the manga are taken from the dubbed anime. A one-shot of the GX manga was released on June 21, 2014 in the August issue of V Jump. The one-shot was written and illustrated by Naoyuki Kageyama. An English version of this chapter was released on December 29, 2014 by Weekly Shonen Jump.

Video games

Several video games based on Yu-Gi-Oh! GX have been developed and published by Konami.

Two games were released for Game Boy Advance; Yu-Gi-Oh! Ultimate Masters: World Championship Tournament 2006, and Yu-Gi-Oh! GX Duel Academy.

Three games have been released for Nintendo DS; Yu-Gi-Oh! Duel Monsters GX Spirit Caller, Yu-Gi-Oh! Duel Monsters World Championship 2007 and Yu-Gi-Oh! World Championship 2008. A fourth title, Yu-Gi-Oh! Duel Monsters GX Card Almanac, is not actually a game, but a catalog of cards up to 2007.

The Tag Force series has appeared on the PlayStation Portable, which adds the ability to form tag team duels, with the first three games in the series being based on the GX series (subsequent games are based on Yu-Gi-Oh! 5D's). The titles are Yu-Gi-Oh! GX Tag Force, Yu-Gi-Oh! GX Tag Force 2 and Yu-Gi-Oh! GX Tag Force 3. The first game was also ported to PlayStation 2 as Yu-Gi-Oh! GX: Tag Force Evolution. So far, Tag Force 3 has not been released in North America. It was however, released in Europe, and its follow up, Yu-Gi-Oh! 5D's Tag Force 4, has been released in all regions including North America.

Magazine
In 2007, Eaglemoss productions signed a deal to release a magazine based upon the Yu-Gi-Oh! GX franchise named Yu-Gi-Oh! GX Ultimate Guide. This series of issues (Priced as 99p for Issue 1, £1.99 for Issues 2 to 60 and £4.99 for the Mini Monsters Special Issue) ran from 2007 to 2009 and totalled 61 issues. Each fortnight a collectable would be included in the form a medal (Academy character or duel monster), a Triang (2x shiny or 1x Holographic) or a miniature monster which would stand on its own platform. In Issue 2 a tin was provided to keep medals and Triangs in, along with a further 2 collectable file folders to hold the comics in later issues.

Other media
The artist Inu Mayuge wrote a Yu-Gi-Oh! GX parody titled , posted in V Jump on June 25, 2009.

References

External links

 
 TV Tokyo Yu-Gi-Oh! Duel Monsters GX page 
 NASinc. 
 

2004 anime television series debuts
2005 manga
Adventure anime and manga
Anime spin-offs
Comics based on television series
Funimation
Gallop (studio)
Science fiction anime and manga
Card games in anime and manga
Shōnen manga
Shueisha manga
Shueisha franchises
Toonami
TV Tokyo original programming
Yu-Gi-Oh!
Yu-Gi-Oh!-related anime
Viz Media manga
Television series about parallel universes